Stephen Lawrence Hertz (born October 3, 1950) is an American former college baseball coach. Hertz was the head coach of the Gonzaga Bulldogs in 1978 before holding the same position at UC Irvine from 1979 to 1980.  Hertz returned to Gonzaga prior to the 1981 season and coached there through the end of the 2003 season.  Under Hertz, Gonzaga appeared in two NCAA Tournaments (1978 and 1981), six Pac-10 Northern Division Tournaments (1986–1991), and one West Coast Conference Championship Series (2001). Hertz's career head coaching record was 697-678-5.

Hertz played college baseball at both Los Angeles Pierce College and at Gonzaga.  He was signed by Major League Baseball's Minnesota Twins in 1972 and played three seasons of minor league baseball (1972–1974).

Head coaching record
The following is a table of Hertz's yearly records as an NCAA head baseball coach.

References

Living people
1950 births
Charlotte Twins players
Fort Lauderdale Yankees players
Gonzaga Bulldogs baseball coaches
Gonzaga Bulldogs baseball players
Lynchburg Twins players
UC Irvine Anteaters baseball coaches
Sportspeople from Glendale, California